Kyriaki is a village and a community of the Livadeia municipality, Greece. Before the 2011 local government reform Kyriaki was an independent community. The 2011 census recorded 2,298 in the community of Kyriaki and 2,185 in the village proper. The community of Kyriaki covers an area of 130.36 km2.

Settlements

Kyriaki
Agios Athanasios
Karyoti
Tarsos
Panagia Kalamiotissa

Population

Geography
A few farmlands are around the area.  The mountains that are mainly filled with grasslands and rocks covers around the area, forests are found mainly in low-lying areas.  The Gulf of Corinth is approximately 5 to 6 km southwest.

See also
List of settlements in Boeotia

External links
 Kyriaki on GTP Travel Pages

References

Populated places in Boeotia